Coudia is a genus of moths in the family Gelechiidae. It contains the species Coudia strictella, which is found in Algeria.

The wingspan is 10 mm. The forewings are greyish-yellow, with the base, median and terminal areas brown-reddish. The hindwings are uniform brown-reddish.

References

Gelechiinae